Edward Harrison DeArmond (July 4, 1878 – October 21, 1948) was a United States Army officer in the early 20th century who was awarded the Distinguished Service Medal.

Biography
DeArmond was born in Greenfield, Missouri, on July 4, 1878. He graduated from the United States Military Academy in 1901 and was commissioned in the Artillery Corps, choosing to serve in the Field Artillery Corps when the former split in two. DeArmond served in the Philippines, participating in the U.S. Army's response to the Moro Rebellion in 1904. Between 1909 and 1912, he served in the Tactics Department of the U.S. Military Academy.

In World War I, DeArmond served as chief of staff of the 32nd Infantry Division during its training period and while in France between August 26, 1917, and May 1, 1918. After this, he became the chief of staff for the American Expeditionary Forces and was promoted to the rank of brigadier general on August 8, 1918. DeArmond was awarded the Distinguished Service Medal due to his performance as general.

From 1924 to 1928, DeArmond served at the Office of the Chief of Field Artillery, and he served in the Second United States Army as an artillery officer. Retiring from the army at the rank of brigadier general, DeArmond died on October 21, 1948, in Lexington, Virginia.

References

Bibliography

1878 births
1948 deaths
People from Greenfield, Missouri
United States Army generals of World War I
United States Army generals
Recipients of the Distinguished Service Medal (US Army)
United States Military Academy alumni
Military personnel from Missouri